USS Eugene E. Elmore (DE-686) was a Rudderow-class destroyer escort in the United States Navy during World War II.

Namesake
Eugene Evans Elmore was born on 30 June 1900 in Americus, Georgia. Lieutenant Commander Elmore was killed in action when Quincy was sunk 9 August 1942 in the Battle of Savo Island.

Construction and service 
Eugene E. Elmore was launched 23 December 1943 by Bethlehem Steel Co., Quincy, Massachusetts, sponsored by Mrs Eugene E. Elmore, widow of the ship's namesake and commissioned 4 February 1944.

 who was rescuing survivors, made a submarine contact and directed Eugene E. Elmore toward the target. Eugene E. Elmore sank U-549 in position  using her hedgehog spigot mortar system and depth charges, all of the boats 57 crew were lost.  Eugene E. Elmore then assisted Barr and took her in tow for Casablanca, being relieved on 2 June, a day before reaching port.

Eugene E. Elmore returned to New York City 13 June 1944, and during the next 4½ months made two voyages escorting convoys to the Mediterranean. On 3 November she got underway from New York for the South Pacific, arriving at Hollandia 11 December to join the 7th Fleet. She cleared Hollandia 30 December and at Biak, joined the convoy escort for operations around Lingayen Gulf. Arriving on 12 January 1945, Eugene E. Elmore joined the ships providing antiaircraft fire to protect the assault shipping for 2 days then sailed to San Pedro Bay to prepare for the landings at Subic Bay 29 January.

The escort vessel continued to operate out of San Pedro Bay, supporting the battles of the Philippines by escorting convoys from Biak, the Palaus, Ulithi and New Guinea. Between 13 July 1945 and 22 August, she twice escorted convoys from the Philippines to Okinawa and on 3 September arrived off Okinawa for occupation duty. In October she escorted transports carrying men to Jinsen, Korea and on 15 October, sailed from Okinawa for San Diego, arriving 5 November. There she was decommissioned and placed in reserve on 31 May 1946.

Eugene E. Elmore received four battle stars for World War II service.

See also
List of destroyer escorts of the United States Navy

References

Rudderow-class destroyer escorts
1944 ships